The 10 cm/50 Type 88 naval gun was a dual-purpose gun used by the Imperial Japanese Navy during World War II.

Description
There were two variants of the 10 cm/50 Type 88 naval gun. One variant had a removable barrel liner while the other had an autofretted monoblock barrel. Both variants had horizontal sliding block breaches, hydro-pneumatic recoil mechanism, and Fixed Quick Fire ammunition. They were dual-purpose guns mounted on HA/LA central pivot mounts with a wide range of elevation that allowed the guns to be used against surface and aerial targets. The gun was capable of a theoretical rate of fire of 12 rounds per minute but this was limited to a practical rate of fire of 6 rounds per minute due to the speed of the pneumatic shell hoist.

Uses 
The 10 cm/50 Type 88 naval gun was used as a Deck gun aboard I-165 class Type KD5 submarines of the Imperial Japanese Navy during World War II.

References

Bibliography

External links
 http://www.navweaps.com/Weapons/WNJAP_39-50_t88.php
http://www.combinedfleet.com/type_kd5.htm

World War II naval weapons
World War II anti-aircraft guns
Naval guns of Japan
100 mm artillery
Military equipment introduced in the 1930s